Jenny Trout (born July 11, 1980) is an American author best known for a series of urban fantasy novels known as the Blood Ties series, published by Mira Books. The books chronicle the life of Dr. Carrie Ames, an emergency room doctor who must adapt to life as a vampire after being attacked by one of her patients. Armintrout's Blood Ties series has been published in five countries, with the first volume making USA Today's top 150 book list. Trout also publishes erotica under the pseudonym Abigail Barnette.

In 2015, Trout officially changed her legal name from Jennifer Lynne Armintrout to Jenny Galifrey Joel Trout.

Reception
Reception to Trout's work has been mixed to positive, with Romantic Times giving her work mostly four stars. Publishers Weekly positively reviewed The Turning, calling it "a squirm-inducing treat", but stating that while American Vampire had an "unusual premise, there's not much to distinguish this from other dark paranormal romances".

Bibliography

Blood Ties series
 The Turning (2006)
 Possession (2007)
 Ashes To Ashes (2007)
 All Souls' Night (2008)

Lightworld/Darkworld series
 Queene of Light (2009)
 Child of Darkness (2009)
 Veil of Shadows (2009)

The Boss series (as Abigail Barnette) 
 The Boss (2013)
 The Girlfriend (2013)
 The Bride (2014)
 The Hook-Up (2014)
 The Ex (2014)
 The Baby (2015)
 The Sister (2017)
 The Boyfriend (2018)
 Sophie (2021)

Standalone novels
 American Vampire (2011)
 Such Sweet Sorrow (as Jenny Trout) (2014)
 Say Goodbye to Hollywood (as Jenny Trout) (2017)
 Where We Land (as Abigail Barnette) (2019)

References

External links
Fantastic Fiction Author Page

Living people
1980 births
American women novelists
21st-century American novelists
American fantasy writers
Women science fiction and fantasy writers
21st-century American women writers
Pseudonymous women writers
21st-century pseudonymous writers